Sir Alfred Brumwell Thomas  (24 February 1868 – 22 January 1948) was an English architect who trained at Westminster School of Art and became an exponent of the Baroque Revival, a style of architecture prevalent for public buildings in the early years of the 20th century.

Thomas was born in Rotherhithe, London, the son of architect Edward Thomas.

In 1899, he designed the West of England Eye Infirmary building in Exeter, which is now a hotel.

In 1906, he was made a fellow of the Royal Institute of British Architects, knighted by King Edward VII, and also designed two more public buildings: town halls in Woolwich in South East London, and in the city of Belfast. Belfast City Hall, faced with portland stone and with a copper dome and lavish marble interiors, is thought of as the finest example of Edwardian Baroque in the British Isles.

Sir Alfred is also known for his war memorials at Dunkirk and Belfast.

Notable works
 Stockport Town Hall, 1905
 Belfast City Hall, 1906
 Woolwich Town Hall, Woolwich 1906 
 Deptford Public Library, 1914, a Carnegie Library
 Addey and Stanhope School, 1899.

Gallery of architectural work

References

1868 births
1948 deaths
Alumni of the Westminster School of Art
Architects from London
Knights Bachelor
People from Virginia Water
Fellows of the Royal Institute of British Architects
People from Rotherhithe